Morning of Owl is a b-boy crew founded in 2002 from Suwon, South Korea. They have won multiple b-boy competitions in Korea and abroad. They've been involved in the b-boying community with their creative shows, as well as in the battle scene. They are known for expressing originality and creativity in their dance. Morning of Owl has performed multiple shows throughout Korea as well as in the UK.

In 2012, Morning of Owl won Battle of the Year Korea and placed in the top 4 in the Battle of the Year World Finals.

In 2013, Morning of Owl won R-16 Korea; R-16 World B-Boy Masters Championship; Break the Floor as Project Soul in Cannes, France; Block Party Battle in France; Rochefort Battle in France; DLK Inspiration Jam Battle, Sweden; United Syles World Finals, Switzerland; Rockin Sensation, Korea; Dance live Korea Battle Side; Gangjin Bboy Masters Championship as well as UK B-Boy Championships. By winning R-16 and UK B-Boy Championships, two of the three major International B-Boy Championships, Morning of Owl arguably became the best bboy crew in the world and were ranked #1 by  Bboyrankingz.com.

In 2018, Morning of Owl appeared and competed on the second season of World of Dance. They were eliminated in the Duels, losing to Ashley & Zack.

Name
In a 2012 interview with allthatbreak, Seung-Ju Lee, the crew manager of Morning of Owl, explained the meaning behind the group's name:

Members
The following are listed alphabetically

Current
Do Young
Mori
Sez (Inactive; manager)

Former
Birdie
Chibi
Cho
Code
Gon
Issue
Kick-ass
M.K.
Owl'd
Pocket
Rocket
Sknuf
Newday
Zebra

Notes

References

External links
 Artist-Morning of Owl 
 Official Website

South Korean dance groups
South Korean breakdancing groups